Yuezhi Zhao (1965) is a Canadian sociologist. She is a Canada Research Chair in Communication and Media Studies and the founder of the Global Media Monitoring Laboratory at Simon Fraser University.  Her research takes an interdisciplinary approach to understanding the relationship between communication and policy in US-China relations, which she regularly publishes research in both English and Chinese, and she is a noted commentator on the policies pursued by the People's Republic of China.

Early life and education
Zhao was born in China, in the Jinyun County of the Zhejiang Province. She completed BA in Journalism from the Beijing Broadcasting Institute in 1984. In 1986, she migrated to Canada to pursue her post-graduate education at Simon Fraser University. There, she earned her MA in Communication in 1989 and Ph.D. in Communication in 1996.

Career
After earning her PhD, Zhao earned a position at the University of California, San Diego in 1997. She left the University of California three years later and returned to SFU in 2000. She joined SFU as a tenure-tracked assistant professor in Communication and Media Studies.

As an Associate professor of communications at SFU, Zhao was appointed a Tier 2 Canada Research Chair in the political economy of global communication in 2005. As a result of her research, she also earned the Chang-Jiang Scholar Award from the People's Republic of China, Ministry of Education in 2009. The next year, she was renewed as a Tier 2 Canada Research Chair and by 2011 was appointed to Tier 1 Canada Research Chair  in the Political Economy of Global Communication.

While teaching at SFU, Zhao created the Global Communication Double MA Degree program, which would win the 2014 gold prize in the Educational Excellence Award category at the Canada-China Business Council's 4th Canada-China Business Excellence Awards.

In 2013, she received SFUs C. Edwin Baker Award for "the Advancement of Scholarship on Media, Markets and Democracy." She was also appointed a Senior Fellow at the Asia Pacific Foundation of Canada. Two years later, Zhao was the recipient of the 2015 Award for Leadership.

In 2019, Zhao was elected a Fellow of the Royal Society of Canada.

Works 

 Author: Communication and Society: Political Economic and Cultural Analysis (2014) Communication University of China Press, 
 Author: Communication in China: Political Economy, Power and Conflict (2008) Rowman & Littlefield Publishers, 
Co-author: Global Communications: Toward a Transcultural Political Economy (2008) Rowman & Littlefield Publishers, 
Author: Media, Market, and Democracy in China: Between the Party Line and the Bottom Line (1998) University of Illinois Press,

References

Year of birth missing (living people)
Living people
Academic staff of Simon Fraser University
Canadian sociologists
Simon Fraser University alumni
Canada Research Chairs
Fellows of the Royal Society of Canada
Canadian women sociologists
20th-century social scientists
21st-century social scientists
20th-century Canadian women scientists
21st-century Canadian women scientists
Chinese emigrants to Canada
Chinese women sociologists
20th-century Canadian scientists
21st-century Canadian scientists
20th-century Chinese scientists
21st-century Chinese scientists
University of California, San Diego faculty
Communication University of China alumni
Scientists from Lishui
Educators from Lishui